Kuntsevskaya is a Moscow Metro station in the Kuntsevo District, Western Administrative Okrug, Moscow, Russia. It is on Arbatsko-Pokrovskaya and Filyovskaya Lines serving as a cross-platform interchange between them and as a terminus of the latter. The station originally opened on 31 August 1965, as part of the extension of the Filyovsky radius, but on 7 January 2008, it was expanded and rebuilt as a part of the Strogino–Mitino extension.

Description
The 1965 construction was designed by Robert Pogrebnoy to a standard design of the 1960s surface level stations, with two identical glazed vestibules on each side of the Rublyovo highway, and two canopies extending over each of the platform ends supported by a single row of marble pillars.

The 2008 reconstruction was designed by Architect A. Vigdorov, and this added a new longer platform running parallel to the old one, larger modern vestibules, and extending the old platform to provide access over the Arbatsko-Porkovskaya's tracks via a glazed overpass.  This was necessary as the old platform length was designed for the Filyovskaya's six-car-long trains, whilst the Arbatsko-Pokrovskaya presently operates seven-car-long trains, with likelihood of them being further lengthened to eight cars long.

North platform was closed for reconstruction since October 2017 to March 2019. A transfer to Kuntsevskaya is planned.

Operation
Before reconstruction, Kuntsevskaya was operating on regular basis as any other station of the Moscow Metro, meaning that trains were passing right-hand side with access through the left door. It was directly connected to the Pionerskaya and Molodyozhnaya stations of the Filyovskaya Line.

The current operation differs in terms of servicing. That is, the new one-track platform gathers trains of Arbatsko-Pokrovskaya arriving from Strogino and dispatches them to Slavyanskiy Bulvar. Arbatsko-Pokrovskaya trains moving in the opposite direction arrive at the southern track of the old platform, while the remaining track is used by Filyovskaya Line (trains coming from Pionerskaya arrive at the track and then head back to Pionerskaya from the same track).

Station design
Architecturally the new platform sufficiently differs from its older neighbour, which was the last of the 1960s surface stations of the Moscow Metro, built at a time when the minimum of resources was spent on architecture and engineering. It includes two vestibules: the western one has its ticket hall outside, whilst the larger eastern one encompasses it into one large structure; marble and granite as well as new metalloplastic materials of orange and brown tones are used.

In the future it is planned that the older platform will also be upgraded with newer technology and decoration similar to its neighbour.

References

Moscow Metro stations
Railway stations in Russia opened in 1965
Arbatsko-Pokrovskaya Line
Filyovskaya Line